The 1964 Memphis State Tigers football team represented Memphis State College (now known as the University of Memphis) as an independent during the 1964 NCAA University Division football season. In its seventh season under head coach Billy J. Murphy, the team compiled a 5–4 record and outscored opponents by a total of 173 to 103. Chuck Brooks and Bob Finnamore were the team captains. The team played its home games at Crump Stadium in Memphis, Tennessee. 

The team's statistical leaders included Billy Fletcher with 921 passing yards and 367 rushing yards, Ray Farmer with 222 receiving yards, and John Wallace Wright with 24 points scored.

Schedule

References

Memphis State
Memphis Tigers football seasons
Memphis State Tigers football